Cameron Puertas Castro (born 18 August 1998) is a Swiss professional footballer who plays as a midfielder for Belgian club Union SG.

Career
Puertas started his career with Swiss amateur club Renens, before joining Forward-Morges in the fifth division at the age of 16, where he was soon considered to be the best player in the regional group.

In 2020, he made first appearance in the Swiss Super League with Lausanne-Sport.

On 22 January 2022, Puertas signed a 3.5-year contract with Union SG in Belgium.

Personal life
Born in Switzerland, Puertas is of Spanish descent.

References

External links
 
 
 SFL Profile

Living people
1998 births
Sportspeople from Lausanne
Swiss men's footballers
Swiss people of Spanish descent
Association football midfielders
FC Lausanne-Sport players
Royale Union Saint-Gilloise players
Swiss Super League players
Swiss Challenge League players
Belgian Pro League players
Swiss expatriate footballers
Expatriate footballers in Belgium
Swiss expatriate sportspeople in Belgium